Alperen Babacan (born 18 July 1997) is a Turkish professional footballer who plays as a centre-back for TFF First League club Gençlerbirliği.

Professional career
Babacan made his senior debut with his hometown club Denizlispor in a 2–2 draw with Karşıyaka on 6 December 2014. Babacan moved to Akhisarspor on 13 July 2017 after a successful season with Denizlispor, scoring five goals from right-back throughout the season.

He made his league debut for Akhisarspor in a 4–2 loss to Galatasaray on 9 December 2017.

On 12 January 2023, Babacan joined TFF First League club Gençlerbirliği on a one-and-a-half-year deal.

References

External links
 
 
 

1997 births
Living people
Sportspeople from Denizli
Turkish footballers
Turkey youth international footballers
Turkey under-21 international footballers
Akhisarspor footballers
Denizlispor footballers
MKE Ankaragücü footballers
Gençlerbirliği S.K. footballers
Süper Lig players
TFF First League players
Association football defenders